Encinitas station is a commuter rail station in Encinitas, California that is on the NCTD COASTER commuter rail line. In addition to COASTER, it is also served by three BREEZE bus routes and LIFT paratransit services. Along with Carlsbad Village station, this is one of two single track stations on the COASTER route, causing a bottleneck for rail traffic.

On October 7, 2013, the Amtrak Pacific Surfliner began stopping at four COASTER stations: Carlsbad Village, Carlsbad Poinsettia, Encinitas, and Sorrento Valley. Amtrak dropped service to Carlsbad Poinsettia and Encinitas on October 9, 2017, due to low ridership.

References

External links

COASTER Stations

North County Transit District stations
Former Amtrak stations in California
Railway stations in the United States opened in 1995
1995 establishments in California